Lac du Monte Tignoso is a small lake in the Monte Renoso massif in the Corse-du-Sud department of France.

Location

It is in the commune of Figari, on the southeast flank of the Montagne de Cagna above the source of the Ruisseau de Vivaggio.
It is a seasonal lake that is dry for much of the year.

See also

List of waterbodies of Corse-du-Sud

Notes

Citations

Sources

Lakes of Corsica